Cindy K. Ambuehl is an American actress and real estate agent.

Career
Ambuehl was born in Los Angeles, California. Before becoming an actress, she was signed by the Judith Fontaine Modeling and Talent Agency as a model. She appeared in Wings as Stella in the season five episode "A Black Eye Affair" and in Seinfeld as Sophie in "The Burning". She also was in the second episode "Temptation" of the first season of Men Behaving Badly. From 2000 to 2003, she had a recurring role on the television series JAG as a TV producer and Harmon Rabb's girlfriend, Rene Peterson.

Personal life
She is married to actor Don Diamont. They have twin sons, born in 2000.

Filmography

Film

Television

References

External links

American film actresses
Actresses from California
Living people
American fashion designers
American women fashion designers
American fashion businesspeople
Female models from California
American soap opera actresses
American television actresses
American real estate brokers
20th-century American actresses
21st-century American actresses

Year of birth missing (living people)